Hill County is the name of two counties in the United States:

 Hill County, Montana 
 Hill County, Texas